Michael Reeves (17 October 1943 – 11 February 1969) was an English film director and screenwriter. He is best remembered for the 1968 film Witchfinder General (known in the US as Conqueror Worm). A few months after the film's release, Reeves died in London at the age of 25 from an accidental alcohol and barbiturate overdose.

History

Witchfinder General
It is for his third and final movie, Witchfinder General, that Reeves is best known. He was only 24 years old when he co-wrote and directed it. In 2005, Total Film magazine named Witchfinder General the 15th-greatest horror film of all time. Made on a modest budget in East Anglia and adapted from the novel by Ronald Bassett, Witchfinder General tells the story of Matthew Hopkins, the lawyer-turned-witchhunter who blackmails and murders his way across the countryside. Reeves imbues the film with a powerful sense of the impossibility of behaving morally in a society whose conventions have broken down, and though it is by no means free of the conventions of low-budget horror, it stands as a notably powerful and evocative film.

Reeves wanted Donald Pleasence to play the title role, but American International Pictures, the film's co-financiers, insisted on using their resident horror star Vincent Price instead. This caused friction between the actor and the young director. A famous story is told of how Reeves won Price's respect: Reeves was constantly telling Price to tone down his over-acting, and to play the role more seriously. Price eventually cracked, snapping, "Young man, I have made eighty-four films. What have you done?" Reeves replied: "I've made three good ones."

Reeves continued to goad Price into delivering a vicious and brilliant performance, and only upon seeing the finished film did the actor realise what the director was up to, at which point Price took steps to bury the hatchet with Reeves. Witchfinder General was released to mixed reviews, with one notably savage notice by Alan Bennett appearing in The Listener, but was soon reassessed and gained generally favourable reviews.

Death
Michael Reeves died in London a few months after the film's release. After shooting Witchfinder General he was at work on an adaptation of The Oblong Box but had difficulties getting projects off the ground and was suffering from depression and insomnia, for which he took tablets and received a variety of treatments from medical and psychiatric practitioners. On the morning of 11 February 1969, Reeves was found dead in his bedroom, aged 25, in Cadogan Place, Knightsbridge, by his cleaning lady. The coroner's report stated that Reeves's death (from a barbiturate overdose) was accidental, the dosage being too marginal to suggest intention.

Select filmography

Slated projects

Some films Reeves was apparently scheduled to direct or for which he was being considered were The Buttercup Chain and De Sade. Both of these films were completed with other directors. Also in development was a film concerning the IRA, which was announced as a forthcoming Tigon production in the trade press, with the title of O'Hooligan's Mob. Reeves had talked of directing an adaptation of Walker Hamilton's novel All The Little Animals, but this did not reach pre-production stage.

Notes

References

External links

BFI, Michael Reeves
BFI, Witchfinder General, review
Guardian Unlimited, Michael Reeves: Witchfinder General review

1943 births
1969 deaths
20th-century English screenwriters
20th-century English male writers
Accidental deaths in London
Barbiturates-related deaths
Drug-related deaths in England
English film directors
English male screenwriters
People educated at Radley College
People from Sutton, London